Gnar Tapes is an independent record label based in Los Angeles, California, United States. Gnar Tapes began releasing solely audio cassette tapes from many Portland-based artists, though it has branched out to releasing artists from around the world via cassette, vinyl, digital, and compact disc. The label was founded in 2008 by Erik Gage, who was 18 years old at the time, in his hometown of Portland, Oregon.

When creating Gnar Tapes, Gage was inspired by DIY tape-culture and based the label's distribution on hand-to-hand trading and mail art. When Gage was in high school, he and his bandmates in White Fang would skip class to intern at Marriage Records. Gnar Tapes has also worked internationally, releasing tapes from Le Elbow (Cape Town, South Africa), Keel Her (Brighton, UK), The Future Dead (Ghent, Belgium), and The Boys Age (Saitama, Japan). Most cassettes on Gnar Tapes are limited editions, being released only once.  In 2013 the label began co-releasing tapes with Burger Records.

The label moved to Los Angeles in late 2014 and opened a retail store in East L.A. in partnership with Burger Records in early 2015 called GNAR BURGER.  Also in 2015 Gnar obtained sub-label Marriage Records and its vast back catalogue which includes releases by Tune-Yards, Dirty Projectors, Karl Blau amongst others.

Notable releases
 Shine Your Light by Gap Dream (co-release w/ Burger Records)
 The Memories by The Memories
 Blonde Rats/Fear Melody by Lucky Dragons
 Strawberry Moon by Yacht
 Disco Worship Mixtape by Yacht
 Gnarcotics Unanimous (Gnar Tapes artist compilation, including unreleased tracks by Calvin Johnson and the Hive Dwellers and Alex Bleeker of Real Estate)
 Demos, Etc. by Young Prisms
 Four Hours (Away) by Young Prisms (cassingle, co-release w/ Kanine Records) 
 Grease by R. Stevie Moore

Roster
 99¢
 A Flint Jamison
 Adrian Orange
 Ben Katzman's DeGreaser
 Blanche Blanche Blanche
 Bobby Birdman
 BOOM!
 The Boys Age
 Breakfast Mountain
 Burning Yellows
 Chill Phil
 CCTV
 CCR Headcleaner
 Cool Angels
 The Courtneys
 Diamond Catalog
 Donnie Blossoms
 E*Rock
 Emotional
 Fat Creeps
 Fat Tony
 Fatal Jamz
 Feather Headdress
 Fungi Girls
 Fuzz Puddle
 Free Weed
 The Future Dead
 Jerry Rogers
 G. Green
 Gap Dream
 Grandparents
 Grapefruit
 Grrrl Friend
 Guantanamo Baywatch
 Honeydrum
 Hound of Love
 Jib Kidder
 Jovontaes
 JUICEBOXXX
 Keel Her
 Kusikia
 Le Elbow
 Little Wings
 The Lemons
 Love Cop
 Lucky Dragons
 Mean Jeans
 Melted Toys
 The Memories
 Mental Theo
 Meth Teeth
 Mind Rays
 Nude Sunrise
 Organized Sports
 The Pooches
 Pop Zeus
 Prescription Pills
 Purple Rhinestone Eagle
 R. Stevie Moore
 The Reservations
 Rich Jensen
 Rob Walmart
 Savages
 Sexhair
 Sexy Water Spiders
 Shapes
 The Shivas
 Skinny Jesus
 Skrill Meadow
 Snow Wite
 Street Gnar
 Timmy The Terror and The Wintercoats
 Travis Wiggins
 The Tubs
 Unkle Funkle
 Wampire
 The Whines
 White Fang
 White Rainbow
 The Woolen Men
 Wyatt Blair
 Yacht
 Young Prisms
 Youthbitch
 Zach Phillips

See also
 DIY ethic
 Burger Records
 Marriage Records

References

External links
 Gnar Tapes Official Website
 Altered Zones "Gnarcotics Anonymous"
 Fader on Gnar Artist Snow Wite

Companies based in Portland, Oregon
American independent record labels
2008 establishments in Oregon